Stefania Balta (born 1954 or 1955) is a Polish-Canadian retired Paralympic athlete. She competed at the 1980 and 1984 Paralympics in Athletics. An amputee since the age of nine after a farming accident, she previously competed for Poland before defecting to represent Canada in the 1976 Paralympics and onward. She lived in Toronto and operated a gas station.

References

Living people
1950s births
Medalists at the 1980 Summer Paralympics
Medalists at the 1984 Summer Paralympics
Athletes from Toronto
Sportspeople from Wrocław
Polish amputees
Canadian amputees
Paralympic gold medalists for Canada
Paralympic bronze medalists for Canada
Paralympic medalists in athletics (track and field)
Athletes (track and field) at the 1980 Summer Paralympics
Athletes (track and field) at the 1984 Summer Paralympics
Paralympic track and field athletes of Canada
Canadian female discus throwers
Canadian female javelin throwers
Canadian female shot putters
Paralympic discus throwers
Paralympic javelin throwers
Paralympic shot putters
Wheelchair discus throwers
Wheelchair javelin throwers
Wheelchair shot putters